Renaldo Fenty (born 13 December 1977) is a Barbadian footballer who currently plays for the Weymouth Wales as a defender.

Career
He played for the Tudor Bridge and Weymouth Wales. He made his international debut for Barbados in 2006.

References

External links
Player profile at the Barbados Football Association

1977 births
Living people
Association football defenders
Barbadian footballers
Barbados international footballers
Weymouth Wales FC players